Prien  is a river of Bavaria, Germany.

After  it discharges into the Chiemsee at the bay Schafwaschener Bucht. It is one of the longest mountain streams in the Bavarian Alps. The name probably derives from the Celtic name of the river, Brigenna, the one coming from the mountains (female) in Celtic languages. The town Prien am Chiemsee was named after the river.

The Prien is, after the Tiroler Achen, the second largest tributary to the Chiemsee.

See also
List of rivers of Bavaria

References

Rivers of Bavaria
Rivers of Germany